Jean Anne Jeavons (born 22 May 1956) is a female English former competition swimmer.

Swimming career
Jeavons swam the Butterfly Stroke for Great Britain and the Melton Mowbray Swimming Club  where she became the county champion and broke the county record which remains to this day.

She represented Great Britain at the 1972 Summer Olympics in Munich   
competing in the women's 100- and 200-metre butterfly, and 4×100-metre medley relay, and came 20th, 9th, and 10th, respectively, missing out on a place in the 200-metre final by a single place and less than a second.

She represented England in the 100 and 200 metres butterfly events, at the 1974 British Commonwealth Games in Christchurch, New Zealand. At the ASA National British Championships she won the 100 metres butterfly title in 1971 and 1972  and the 200 metres butterfly title in 1972 and 1973.

References

External links 
 Melton Mowbray Swimming Club

1956 births
English female swimmers
Olympic swimmers of Great Britain
Swimmers at the 1972 Summer Olympics
Swimmers at the 1974 British Commonwealth Games
Living people
Commonwealth Games competitors for England
20th-century English women
21st-century English women